Mikhaylovka is a rural locality (a selo) and the administrative centre of Mikhaylovsky Selsoviet, Bakalinsky District, Bashkortostan, Russia. The population was 117 as of 2010.

Geography 
It is located 18 km from Bakaly.

References 

Rural localities in Bakalinsky District